Ricardo Iorio (born 25 June 1962) is an Argentine heavy metal singer and bassist who participated in various of the most important metal bands of the nation.

He was one of the founders of V8 (1979–1987) and later founded the successful band Hermética (1988–1994). He has been the singer and main composer of Almafuerte since 1995. His songs are realistic urban stories dealing with the life of lower classes, as well as Argentine 'metalheads'. Even though he played the bass with every band he integrated, he has recently chosen Beto Ceriotti to be the new bassist of Almafuerte, remaining as the singer and main composer of the band (mostly lyrics).

Extremely nationalist, Iorio continuously proclaims in his songs and in the media the pride in being Argentine and Argentine history, and mixes native music styles like tango, Indian and gaucho culture with the heavy metal base of Almafuerte. The young people who go to Almafuerte's shows consider him to be like a patriotic guru.

He left Buenos Aires city to live in the countryside with his daughter Sofía and his girlfriend Fernanda. Iorio's wife, Ana Mourin, committed suicide in 2001. Iorio has also participated in several projects outside metal music, such as with folk musician León Gieco, Rubén Patagonia, Augusto Romero and Los Fabulosos Cadillacs's bassist Flavio Cianciarulo (they recorded an entire album called Peso Argento). He also had a great friendship with the late Argentinian guitar player Norberto Napolitano, also known as Pappo, who invited Iorio to record some songs for his Pappo y Amigos album.

Biography

V8 

Ricardo Iorio and Ricardo "Chofa" Moreno met at age 16, in July 1978 during a screening of the film "The Song Remains the Same" by Led Zeppelin. They became friends, and formed a cover band with Carlos Aragone and Sandro Castaña. They started playing Black Sabbath songs, but soon began composing their first songs, based on characters from the neighbourhood. Castaña leaves the group and they tried with other drummers such as Carlos Ramos, who in turn invited the guitarist Osvaldo Civile to try to join the band but who was not accepted. With Pichi Correa they played three more times, now under the name "Comunión humana".

Finally, the two Ricardos leave that group, but given his friendship stay together and form another. They wrote their first songs at Moreno's house, such as "Voy a enloquecer", "Muy Cansado Estoy", "Si Puedes Vencer Al Temor", "Maligno", etc. They contact Gerardo Osemberg drummer, and have already formed group. Iorio moved to bass and vocals, and the Chofa the guitar. Thanks for the suggestion of a friend, they decide to name the group as V8, as a reference to the V8 engine.

After some concerts as support from other groups, Osemberg left and is replaced by Alejandro Colantonio. They later met the WC group, whose singer Alberto Zamarbide fight with the guitarist and leaves, and take it as a singer in V8. The Chofa leaves the band for health reasons, and proposed as a replacement for Osvaldo Civile, who accepts Iorio despite their musical differences. And Colantonio emigrated to Spain and was replaced by Gustavo Rowek.

They recorded a demo, and later Zamarbide met Pappo, with whose help they could join BARock. The group shocked by his violent music most of the hippies of the public, and became known among metalheads.

The Umbral label recorded their first album in 1983, "Luchando por el metal", with a guest appearance by Pappo. The concerts continue, although on several occasions are defrauded by their representatives. The recording of the second album, "Un paso más en la batalla", was a full marathon that took 300 hours of study and two months of real time.

Rowek and Zamarbide and travel to Brazil to attend the festival Rock in Rio and discover that the situation in that country for a heavy metal band would be more advantageous than in Argentina, so the group traveled to try to settle in that country. However, the situation was more complicated than expected, and Zamarbide and Iorio resolved to return to Argentina alone, leaving Rowek and Civile at Brazil.

To start again with the group, they took the drummer Gustavo Andino and guitarists Walter Giardino and Miguel Roldán. But the first two did not last long and were quickly removed from the band. Giardino had discussions with Iorio about the band's musical direction and even composed songs that were rejected and would use in their next group, Rata Blanca. Andino was replaced by Adrián Cenci, 16, who had already recorded an album with Hard Metal band, playing double bass since 79, and the few that existed in the year 85, a true prodigy. Giardino was not replaced, the group remained only Roldán, returning to have a single guitarist.

But new problems arise soon, also in the formation of the group. On the one hand Iorio was interested in spiritualism, and their colleagues in evangelism, which leads to heated arguments between them, which affect the third album and especially the performances of the band. Mundi Epifanio made an offer for the group to play in Mexico, which ultimately leads to the separation of the band.

Hermética 
After the separation of V8, Iorio made a couple of rehearsals with Martin Kyne from Kamikaze, but got nowhere. Finally he formed the group with vocalist Claudio O'Connor, drummer Fabián Spataro and guitarist Antonio Romano. Their first show was in Centro Cultural Recoleta. Shortly after that show Fabian Spataro left the band being replaced by Tony Scotto, and in 1989 they recorded their self-titled debut album, Hermética, through the new label Radio Tripoli. It was also the first album in which Ricardo Iorio recorded lead vocals on a track ("Desde el oeste").

Passing hyperinflation recorded an album of covers, Intérpretes, and his next studio album was "Ácido Argentino".

The band's popularity grew from its inception, despite not having songs in radio or any really important broadcasting. In 1993 they recorded the live album "En Vivo 1993 Argentina" at Stadium, and by 1994, just 6 years after playing for 150 people taking part in the festival Monsters of Rock played alongside Slayer, Kiss, Black Sabbath, Motorhead and others and fill River Plate stadium. In the presentation of their third album, "Víctimas del vaciamiento", filling the stadium Sanitation and recorded a live album.

However, Iorio ends the year fighting with his bandmates and unexpectedly disbanding Hermetica. Iorio argued that relations with the other band members would have deteriorated, while others declare exhaustion of not being consulted on the organizational aspects of the band.

Almafuerte 
After the disband of Hermetica Iorio formed the Almafuerte group with Claudio Cardacci and Claudio Marciello and where Iorio began to sing their songs regularly.

His former colleagues formed Malon, with whom Iorio began a fierce rivalry. Iorio made a song against them, "Buitres", while they gave him "La Fábula del avestruz y el jabalí".

The first album, "Mundo Guanaco" managed to get out before the first of Malon, but had several covers. "Desencuentro" of Cátulo Castillo, a tango transformed into Heavy Metal, "De los pagos del tiempo" by José Larralde (presented by Hermética at the Obras Sanitarias Stadium), "Voy a enloquecer" V8, with the name and original lyrics that V8 renamed as "No enloqueceré" by the intervention of fellow then, and finally the issue as oxen letter has a poem by Pedro Bonifacio Palacios, whose homage Almafuerte author takes its name.

After this album Iorio filmed the first video clip of his career, for the song "El Pibe Tigre".

The following year Flavio Cianciarulo from Los Fabulosos Cadillacs produced their second album, "Del Entorno", in which all songs are by Almafuerte. This time does not include folk songs, as such compositions intended Iorio a solo album with Flavio that would next year: Peso Argento.

Related groups Horcas, Logos and Rata Blanca perform a festival together in the Obras Sanitarias Stadium, Metal Rock Festival, after which there was a "meeting" to go V8 Osvaldo Civile (guitar), Alberto Zamarbide (vocals), Gustavo Rowek (drums) and Miguel Roldán (bass, was part of V8 but as a guitarist) to play songs of the group. Almafuerte had been invited to participate but Iorio refused stating that his later groups would exceed V8.

In 1998 Malon disbands and Iorio referred to in the song "Triunfo" of self-titled new album, Almafuerte, which also includes a track where they explain why his name.

In 1999 provide a theme for the soundtrack of the film "El visitante", which include in his album "A Fondo Blanco". The album also included the first incursions of Iorio at Tango (excluding "Cambalache" and "Desencuentro", where tangos were reformulated as Heavy Metal songs), which were designed for a possible second album with Flavio but no decision could be made by Polygram.

Discography

Bibliography

References

External links

1962 births
Argentine heavy metal singers
Argentine heavy metal bass guitarists
20th-century Argentine male singers
Argentine rock singers
Argentine people of Italian descent
Argentine anti-communists
People from Tres de Febrero Partido
Living people
Christian metal musicians
Male bass guitarists